The  Virginia Destroyers season was the third season for the United Football League franchise and its first since relocating from Orlando, where they played as the Florida Tuskers. Guided by head coach and general manager Marty Schottenheimer, the Destroyers finished the truncated regular season with a 3–1 record and defeated Las Vegas 17–3 in the October 21 Championship Game for the franchise's first UFL title.

Offseason

UFL draft

Personnel

Staff

PA announcer - Henry W. Ayer III
}}

Roster

Schedule

Standings

Game summaries

Week 1: at Omaha Nighthawks

Week 2: vs. Las Vegas Locomotives

Week 4: vs. Sacramento Mountain Lions

Week 5: at Sacramento Mountain Lions

References

Virginia Destroyers season
Virginia Destroyers seasons
Virginia Destroyers